Blackwall was a railway station in Blackwall, London, that served as the eastern terminus of the Commercial Railway (later the London and Blackwall Railway).

The station was designed by architect William Tite in an ornate Italianate style. It opened on 6 July 1840 with services connecting with a ferry service to Gravesend, Kent.

Between 1870 and 1890 the station was also served by some North London Railway trains from Broad Street via Hackney and Bow services to connect to the ferry services. The station was renovated at this time.
 
In March 1926 the London and North Eastern Railway and Port of London Authority announced passenger services would be withdrawn on 30 June 1926. However, with the start of the national general strike services were suspended early on 3 May 1926, and never resumed.

John Betjeman (1906-1984) in his book First and Last Loves, wrote of a journey on the L&BR "Those frequent and quite empty trains of the Blackwall Railway ran from a special platform at Fenchurch Street. I remember them. Like stagecoaches they rumbled past East End chimney pots, wharves and shipping stopping at empty black stations till they came to a final halt at Blackwall station...When one emerged there, there was nothing to see beyond it but a cobbled quay and a vast stretch of wind whipped water..."

The station was demolished in 1946 to make way for Blackwall power station, although the branch continued to carry goods traffic until the demise of the docks in the late 1960s.

Today no trace of the two-storey station remains, and the docks have been filled in (although a small basin remains). Its approximate location is now occupied by houses on Jamestown Way. The station site is some distance from the present-day Blackwall DLR station; the closest existing station is actually East India DLR station, which is slightly to the north-west of the original Blackwall station site.

References

External links
Map of Poplar & Blackwall from 1885
Blackwall on Disused-Stations.org

Disused railway stations in the London Borough of Tower Hamlets
Railway stations in Great Britain opened in 1840
Railway stations in Great Britain closed in 1926
Former London and Blackwall Railway stations
Poplar, London